Ornamental may refer to:

Ornamental grass, a type of grass grown as a decoration
Ornamental iron, mild steel that has been formed into decorative shapes, similar to wrought iron work
Ornamental plant, a plant that is grown for its ornamental qualities
Ornament (architecture), a decorative detail used to embellish parts of a building or interior furnishing
Ornament (art)
Ornament (music), musical flourishes that are not necessary to the overall melodic (or harmonic) line

Music
Ornamental, a music group formed as a side project of Strawberry Switchblade vocalist Rose McDowall

See also
Ornament (disambiguation)